The following lists events that happened during 1975 in Spanish Sahara.

Events

May
 May 12-19 - After initially having been denied entry by Spanish authorities, Simeon Aké, UN ambassador of the Côte d'Ivoire (Ivory Coast); Marta Jiménez Martinez, a Cuban diplomat; and Manouchehr Pishva, from Iran did a UN tour of the country to investigate political instability and impose the United Nations General Assembly Resolution 3292.

October
 October 1 - Morocco and Mauritania announced they would invade Western Sahara and split it between themselves after Spain announces a referendum would be held for the Sahrawi colony.
 October 16 - Moroccan King Hassan II announced plans for a march of over 350,000 civilians across the border to Western Sahara to claim the parts of Western Sahara for Morocco.

November
 November 6 - Morocco begins a Green March into Spanish Sahara with unarmed civilians, despite Spain's warnings of them being shot.
 November 9 - When Spain announced it will not fight for Western Sahara, Morocco's Green March was called off. Moroccan King Hassan II said, "Spain is not only a friendly country, it also is a neighborly and fraternal nation."
 November 14 - Spain abandons Western Sahara and announces that it will be divided between Morocco and Mauritania.

December
 December 10 - The Polisario Front begins their first attack, striking Mauritanian troops in Western Sahara.

References

 
1970s in Spanish Sahara
Sahara
Years of the 20th century in Spanish Sahara
Spanish Sahara
Spanish Sahara